Thomas Alfred Horton,  (16 June 1941 – 7 December 2017) was an English professional golfer. He finished in the top ten of the Open Championship four times, won a number of important tournaments both before and after the founding of the European Tour in 1972 and played in the Ryder Cup in 1975 and 1977. He reached 50 just before the founding of the European Seniors Tour and won 23 times on the tour between 1992 and 2000.

Early life
Horton was born in St Helens, Merseyside; he moved to Jersey in 1945 and was brought up and educated on the island.

Professional career
Horton was an assistant at Ham Manor Golf Club near Worthing, Sussex from 1959, later becoming the professional there. In 1974 he moved to Royal Jersey Golf Club. He celebrated 25 years there as professional before his retirement in 1999.

Horton was one of the "Butten boys", a group of British professional golfers who were part of a training programme, funded by Ernest Butten, an entrepreneur and joint founder of PA Consulting Group.  Starting in 1963, Butten funded a residential golf school at Sundridge Park in Bromley, Kent. Max Faulkner was employed as the teaching professional.

Horton was runner-up a number of times before his first important win, the R.T.V. International Trophy at Cork Golf Club in August 1968. He had been runner-up in the Carroll's International in 1965 and 1967 and the Martini International earlier in 1968. He was also close to winning the Silentnight Tournament in 1965. Dave Thomas had taken the clubhouse lead. Playing with Jimmy Martin, they reached the final hole with Horton needed a par 4 to beat Thomas while Martin needed a par to tie with Thomas. Martin missed a birdie putt from 10 feet and finished level with Thomas. Horton, however, drove into a bunker, missed a 5-foot putt and took a double-bogey 6 to finish one behind in third place.

Horton won two important tournaments in 1970, the South African Open in February and the Long John Scotch Whisky Match Play Championship in August. He became the first non-South African resident to win the South African Open since it had been first played in 1903, with a three stroke win over Terry Westbrook. In the match play championship he beat Bobby Walker 5&4 in the semi-final before beating another Scot, Ronnie Shade, 3&2 in the final, winning the first prize of £2,000. Horton had been four down against Neil Coles after 10 holes in their quarter-final match but came back to win on the 18th.

Horton played on the European Tour for many years with moderate success, winning four titles and finishing fifth on the Order of Merit in 1976 and tenth in both 1974 and 1978. His biggest win on the tour came in the 1978 Dunlop Masters. Needing a par-3 on the 245-yard final hole at St Pierre, Horton missed the green but holed a 10-foot putt for a one stroke win over Dale Hayes, Graham Marsh and Brian Waites, taking the first prize of £8,000.

Horton had been in contention for a Ryder Cup place as early as 1965. That year he was 11th in the Ryder Cup points list before the final qualifying event, the Esso Golden Tournament, with the leading 10 making the team. However he finished last in the tournament and dropped to 14th place. From 1969 the Ryder Cup team was partly chosen by a selection committee. Horton was a strong candidate in 1969 and 1971 but was not selected until 1975 at Laurel Valley Golf Club. Four members of the 12-man team were selected by committee and with two US-based players chosen, Tony Jacklin and Peter Oosterhuis, there were only two places for the remaining players. Despite finishing 15th in the points list, Horton was selected, making his debut at the age of 34. Horton lost his three pairs matches but on the final day he halved his match against Hale Irwin in the morning singles and beat Lou Graham in the afternoon. Horton played again in 1977 at Royal Lytham. He was 5th in the Ryder Cup points list and gained an automatic spot for the first time. He lost the three matches he played, all by the same score, 5&4.

The European Seniors Tour was founded shortly after he reached its minimum age of fifty, and Horton was the dominant player in its early seasons, topping the money list in 1993, 1996, 1997, 1998 and 1999. He was top of the tour's career money list for many years, before being overtaken by Carl Mason in 2007. Mason equalled Horton total of 23 victories in 2010 and had his 24th win the following year. Horton's career winnings on the senior tour exceeded £1,000,000 and he remains second on the list of most wins of the tour.

Horton was captain of the PGA in 1978, captaining the PGA Cup team the same year at St Mellion.

Honours
In the 2000 New Year Honours, Horton was awarded an MBE for services to golf, and he was made an honorary life member of the European Tour in 2012.

Death
Horton was taken ill at the Annual General Meeting of the Royal Jersey Golf Club on 7 December 2017 and died later that evening in hospital.

Photo gallery

Professional wins (41)

European Tour wins (4)

European Tour playoff record (0–1)

Safari Circuit wins (1)

Swedish Golf Tour wins (1)

Other Great Britain and Ireland wins (4)

Other wins (4)
1970 South African Open
1973 Nigerian Open
1975 Gambian Open
1985 Togo Open

European Senior Tour wins (23)

*Note: The 1997 Scottish Seniors Open was shortened to 36 holes due to the Funeral of Diana, Princess of Wales.

European Senior Tour playoff record (4–1)

Other senior wins (4)
1995 British Senior Club Professional Championship
1996 British Senior Club Professional Championship
1997 British Senior Club Professional Championship
1998 British Senior Club Professional Championship

Results in major championships

Note: Horton only played in the Masters Tournament and the Open Championship.

CUT = missed the half-way cut (3rd round cut in 1979 and 1982 Open Championships)
"T" indicates a tie for a place

Summary

Most consecutive cuts made – 6 (1971 Open Championship – 1976 Open Championship)
Longest streak of top-10s – 1 (four times)

Team appearances
Ryder Cup (representing Great Britain and Ireland): 1975, 1977
World Cup (representing England): 1976
Double Diamond International (representing England): 1971 (winners), 1974 (winners), 1975, 1976 (winners), 1977
Sotogrande Match/Hennessy Cognac Cup (representing Great Britain and Ireland): 1974 (winners), 1976 (winners)
PGA Cup: 1978 (winners, non-playing captain)
Praia d'El Rey European Cup: 1997 (winners, captain), 1998 (tie, captain), 1999 (captain)

See also
List of golfers with most European Senior Tour wins
European Tour tribute video

References

External links

English male golfers
European Tour golfers
European Senior Tour golfers
Ryder Cup competitors for Europe
Members of the Order of the British Empire
Sportspeople from St Helens, Merseyside
1941 births
2017 deaths